Nemausa (minor planet designation: 51 Nemausa) is a large main-belt asteroid that was discovered on January 22, 1858, by Joseph Jean Pierre Laurent. Laurent made the discovery from the private observatory of Benjamin Valz in Nîmes, France. The house, at 32 rue Nationale in Nîmes, has a plaque commemorating the discovery. With Laurent's permission, Valz named the asteroid after the Celtic god Nemausus, the patron god and namesake of Nîmes during Roman times.

Based upon its spectrum, this is listed as a C-type asteroid in the Tholen classification taxonomy, and as a Cgh by Bus and Binzel (2002). This indicates a composition similar to carbonaceous chondrite meteorites. Absorption features in the spectrum indicate the presence of phyllosilicates. It may have a water content of about 14%.

The first stellar occultation was observed on August 17, 1979, from the Gissar and Alma-Ata observatories produced two chords which were used to estimate a diameter of 150 km for the asteroid. This is close to the present-day estimate of 147.9 km.  Since then 51 Nemausa has been observed 20 times in stellar occultation.

Light curve inversion model DAMIT 1065 is a good match to a seven-chord occultation observed on 3rd September 2016, from which an equivalent Volume mean diameter of 146.4km, and an equivalent Surface mean diameter of 150.3 km was obtained.

Lightcurve data suggests that it may have a small moon. Nemausa has been studied by radar.

See also 
162 Laurentia

References

External links 
 
 

Background asteroids
Nemausa
Nemausa
Objects observed by stellar occultation
CU-type asteroids (Tholen)
Ch-type asteroids (SMASS)
18580122